Cauvin Bank is a wholly submerged atoll structure in the Southern Part Chagos Archipelago at , just about  South of the Southeastern corner of the rim of the Great Chagos Bank. The closest land is the northernmost part of Diego Garcia atoll, Middle Island,  to the South.

External links
Indian Ocean Pilot (download PDF)

Chagos Archipelago